Gregor Rabinovitch (2 April 1889–12 November 1953) was a Ukrainian-born film producer who worked for many years in the German film industry. He emigrated to France from the Soviet Union in the early 1920s. After working for a time in Germany, he left following the Nazi takeover of power in 1933, and spent a number of years in France and the United States. He later returned and died in Munich in 1953.

In 1932 he set up the production company Cine-Allianz with Arnold Pressburger. The company enjoyed commercial success, but was subsequently expropriated from them by the Nazi government of Germany as part of the anti-Jewish policy.

Selected filmography
 Heart of an Actress (1924)
 Michel Strogoff (1926)
 600,000 Francs a Month (1926)
 The Loves of Casanova (1927)
 Looping the Loop (1928)
 Hurrah! I Live! (1928)
 Secrets of the Orient (1928)
 The Wonderful Lies of Nina Petrovna (1929)
 Dolly Gets Ahead (1930)
 The White Devil (1930)
 Calais-Dover (1931)
 In the Employ of the Secret Service (1931)
 No More Love (1931)
 Lumpenkavaliere (1932)
 Tell Me Tonight (1932)
 The Song of Night (1932)
 The Countess of Monte Cristo (1932)
 All for Love (1933)
 Gently My Songs Entreat (1933)
 A Song for You (1933)
 Spies at Work (1933)
 My Heart Calls You (1934)
 So Ended a Great Love (1934)
 The Blonde Carmen (1935)
 Gibraltar (1938)
 Port of Shadows (1938)
 I Was an Adventuress (1938)
 There's No Tomorrow (1939)
 Night in December (1940)
 Beating Heart (1940)
 Three Russian Girls (1943)
 The Lady of the Camellias (1947)
 The Legend of Faust (1949)
 Aida (1953)
 The Divorcée (1953)

Bibliography
 Phillips, Alastair. City of Darkness, City of Light: émigré Filmmakers in Paris, 1929-1939. Amsterdam University Press, 2004
 Prawer, S.S. Between Two Worlds: The Jewish Presence in German and Austrian Film, 1910-1933. Berghahn Books, 2007.

External links

1889 births
1953 deaths
French film producers
German film producers
Ukrainian film producers
Jews from the Russian Empire
Ukrainian Jews
Film people from Kyiv
People from Kiev Governorate 
Jewish emigrants from Nazi Germany to France
Soviet emigrants to France